Pedasus (Ancient Greek: Πήδασος) has been identified with several personal and place names in Greek history and mythology.

Persons

In Homer's Iliad, Pedasus was the name of a Trojan warrior, and the son of the naiad Abarbarea and human Bucolion. His twin brother was Aesepus; both were slain by Euryalus, the son of Mecisteus, during the Trojan War.

In Homer's Iliad, Pedasus was also the name of a swift horse taken as booty by Achilles when he killed Eetion. This horse was killed by a spear during a duel between Patroclus and Sarpedon.

Places

Pedasus (Caria): In Caria, according to Herodotus, the Battle of Pedasus (Summer of 496 BCE) was a night ambush where the Carians annihilated a Persian army. This engagement occurred during the Ionian Revolt (499-494 BCE).

Pedasus (Messenia): In Peloponnese, Methone has been identified with the vine-covered Pedasus, one of the seven cities offered by Agamemnon to Achilles to quell his rage and to persuade him to return to the Siege of Troy.

Pedasus (Mysia): In the Troad, there was another Pedasus on the Satnioeis river, said to be inhabited by a tribe called the Leleges.  During the Trojan War, this Pedasus was ruled over by a certain king named Altes, who was killed by Agamemnon. This city was sacked by Achilles.

Notes

References 

 Herodotus, The Histories with an English translation by A. D. Godley. Cambridge. Harvard University Press. 1920. . Online version at the Topos Text Project. Greek text available at Perseus Digital Library.
 Homer, The Iliad with an English Translation by A.T. Murray, Ph.D. in two volumes. Cambridge, MA., Harvard University Press; London, William Heinemann, Ltd. 1924. . Online version at the Perseus Digital Library.
 Homer, Homeri Opera in five volumes. Oxford, Oxford University Press. 1920. . Greek text available at the Perseus Digital Library.

Trojans
Characters in the Iliad